Elections for the Shimla Municipal Corporation were held in May 2012. These were the first direct elections for mayor and deputy mayor in the corporation's history. 13 out of 25 wards were reserved for women for the first time.

Background 
The Indian National Congress won a majority of 15 seats in the previous municipal corporation elections and the party selected Madhu Sood mayor of Shimla.

Overview 
The Himachal Pradesh state Bharatiya Janata Party government decided to elections for the post of mayor and deputy mayor directly for the first time as opposed to letting the party with the majority in the corporation deciding the posts on its own.

The Communist Party of India (Marxist) made history by capturing both the posts of mayor and deputy mayor, unseating the Indian National Congress in its bastion of 25 years.

Results

Mayoral election

Mayor

Deputy Mayor

Municipal Corporation

References 

2012 in Indian politics
Shimla